The Immediate Geographic Region of Três Corações is one of the 10 immediate geographic regions in the Intermediate Geographic Region of Varginha, one of the 70 immediate geographic regions in the Brazilian state of Minas Gerais and one of the 509 of Brazil, created by the National Institute of Geography and Statistics (IBGE) in 2017.

Municipalities 
It comprises 6 municipalities.

 Cambuquira     
 Campanha     
 Carmo da Cachoeira     
 São Bento Abade     
 São Tomé das Letras     
 Três Corações

References 

Geography of Minas Gerais